Pat Chatborirak  (born May 1, 1989 in Thailand), nickname Pat, is a Thai model and actor.

Early life and education  
Pat was born on Monday, 1 May 1989 in Bangkok, Thailand. He is the youngest among the three sons of Lephong Mahanikhajorn and Ngamthip Chatbirirak. Pat has 2 brothers, Pakorn Chatborirak, Thana Chatborirak , and also another adoptive sister, Wanmai Chatborirak.

Pat graduated from primary school from Assumption College (Thailand), lower secondary school from Bodindecha (Sing Singhaseni) School, upper secondary school from Triam Udom Suksa School and received a Bachelor's degree from the Faculty of Education, Chulalongkorn University (1st Class Honors). He has also served as the Faculty of Chulalongkorn University for the Chula–Thammasat Traditional Football Match event and has a Master's degree from the Faculty of Communication Arts, Chulalongkorn University.

Career 
Pat stepped into the industry by being a guest of Boy Pakorn, along with Nong Thana on the intricate program. After that, he had the opportunity to shoot many commercials and become a model for many magazines. Came to Channel 3 to see the glitter, so he called Pat to sign the contract as an actor under Thai color television Channel 3.

And in 2015, the first drama is Sai Lap Sam Mithii  in the chapter wisawa in the role of inventor. Pat has a second drama. Paen Rai Long Tai Wa Rak in the chapter Tawan.

As for the work, create a name that is the most talked about, and the creation of the name that is the most talked about is Bunlang Dok Mai  In the role of Karan  It was his first episode that received overwhelming response.

Filmography

Television series

References

External links 

 (Instagram fan club)
FaceBook Fanpage

1989 births
Living people
Pat Chatborirak
Pat Chatborirak
Pat Chatborirak
Pat Chatborirak
Pat Chatborirak

Pat Chatborirak
Pat Chatborirak